Daniel Freire (born 29 December 1961, in Buenos Aires) is an Argentine film actor.

He had his film debut in 1993 in Un Muro de silencio and has appeared in over 15 films including Las Aventuras de Dios 2000 in which he portrayed Jesus Christ and Arizona Sur in 2004.

In 2005 he appeared in 27 episodes of the Spanish TV series Motivos personales.

He has lived in Spain since 1999.

Filmography
"Amar es para siempre" (2014-actualidad)....Aquilino González
 Adius Amoto ....Gervasio (2011)
 Doctor Mateo .... Tomas Pellegrini "Tom" (2008-2011)
 Un ajuste de cuentas (2009) .... Josito Fernández
 MIR .... Dr. Javier Lapartida (2007-2008)
 El síndrome de Ulises (1 episode, 2008)
 Ese beso (2008)
 Hermanos & detectives (1 episode, 2007)
 El niño de barro (2007) .... Comisario Petrie. / The Mudboy (International: English title)
 Arizona sur (2007)
 Masala (2007) (TV)
 Límites naturales (2006)
 Motivos personales .... Daniel Garralda (2005)
 Aliteración (2005)
 Machulenco (2005) .... Víctor
 Interior (noche) (2005) .... Emilio
 El mono de Hamlet (2005)
 Laura (2004/I)
 Catarsis (2004) .... Enrique
 Matar al ángel (2004) .... Sabino
 Una pasión singular (2003) .... Blas Infante
 Ana y los siete (2002) TV series .... David (unknown episodes, 2002-2004)
 El refugio del mal (2002) .... Martín
 Impulsos (2002) .... Jaime. / Impulses (International: English title)
 Lucía y el sexo (2001) .... Carlos/Antonio. / Lucia et le sexe (France). / Sex and Lucia (International: English title)
 Sagitario (2001) .... Gustavo
 Las aventuras de Dios (2000) .... Jesus Christ. / The Adventures of God (International: English title)
 Balada del primer amor (1999)
 El milagro de Sara Duval (1998)
 Canción desesperada (1997)
 El censor (1995) .... Hombre Basural. / The Eyes of the Scissors (International: English title)
 Un muro de silencio (1993). / A Wall of Silence (International: English title). / Black Flowers (International: English title)

Self
 La mandrágora .... Himself / ... (6 episodes, 2005-2009)
 3 i més (2006) TV series .... Himself (2007)
 Versión española .... Himself (1 episode, 2005). / Episode dated 29 April 2005 (2005) TV episode .... Himself
 La noche con Fuentes y cía. .... Himself (1 episode, 2005). / Episode dated 24 April 2005 (2005) TV episode .... Himself
 XVIII Premios Goya (2004) (TV) .... Himself - Presenter: Best New Actress & Best Costume Design
 Jimanji kanana .... Himself (1 episode, 2003). / Episode dated 10 August 2003 (2003) TV episode .... Himself
 Lo + plus .... Himself (1 episode, 2002). / Episode dated 18 December 2002 (2002) TV episode .... Himself
 El Che (1997) .... Alejandro. / El Che - Ernesto Guevara: Enquête sur un homme de légende (France: poster title)

Archive Footage
 52 premis Sant Jordi de cinematografia (2008) (TV) .... Comisario Petrie
 Maquillando entre monstruos (2007) (TV) .... Carlos/Antonio

External links
 

1961 births
Living people
People from Buenos Aires
Argentine male film actors